Ranulfo Cortés (born 9 July 1934) is a Mexican former football forward who was a squad member of the Mexico national team in the 1954 FIFA World Cup, although he never played for the national team. He also played for CD Oro.

References

External links
FIFA profile

1934 births
Possibly living people
Mexican footballers
Mexico international footballers
Association football forwards
CD Oro footballers
1954 FIFA World Cup players